The diverse morphological, climatic and hydrological conditions of Albania favour the formation of varied geological features. According to the Ministry of Environment, 25 canyons are part of the national list of natural monuments. A selected list follows:

Canyons and gorges

See also  
 Protected areas of Albania
 Geography of Albania

References 

 

 
Rock formations
Albania